Sabina Shoal, also known as Escoda Shoal; Mandarin ; , is an atoll in the NE of Dangerous Ground in the Spratly Islands. The Philippines puts it under the jurisdiction of Brgy. Pag-asa, Kalayaan, Palawan. It is claimed by the People's Republic of China, and the Republic of China (Taiwan).

Geography 
Sabina Shoal lies in position 09° 45' N 116° 28' E, 123.6 nautical miles from Palawan Island.

The eastern half of Sabina Shoal consists of reefs awash, while the western half consists of banks 3.7 to 8.3 meters deep, and reefs enclosing a lagoon. The features are well within the Philippines' EEZ closest to Palawan island.

Disputes and controversies
In 1995, soon after occupying Mischief Reef, China (PRC) installed 3 buoys near Sabina Shoal. They were confiscated by the Philippines.

On April 27, 2021, during a joint maritime patrol operations of the Philippine Coast Guard (PCG) and Bureau of Fisheries and Aquatic Resources (BFAR) in the area, seven Chinese maritime militia vessels were spotted anchored at the shoal. After several challenges from BRP Cabra of PCG, the militia vessels promptly left the area.

References 

Shoals of the Spratly Islands
Territorial disputes of China
Territorial disputes of the Republic of China
Territorial disputes of the Philippines
Disputed territories in Southeast Asia